Xenopeltis,  the sunbeam snakes, are the sole genus of the monotypic family Xenopeltidae, the species of which are found in Southeast Asia. Sunbeam snakes are known for their highly iridescent scales. Three species are recognized, each one with no subspecies. Studies of DNA suggest that the xenopeltids are most closely related to the Mexican burrowing python (Loxocemus bicolor) and to the true pythons (Pythonidae).

Description

The head scales are made up of large plates much like those of the Colubridae, while the ventral scales are only slightly reduced. Pelvic vestiges are not present.

The dorsal color pattern is a reddish-brown, brown, or blackish color. The belly is an unpatterned whitish-gray. The scales are highly iridescent.

Geographic range
They are found in Southeast Asia from the Andaman and Nicobar Islands, east through Myanmar to southern China, Thailand, Laos, Cambodia, Vietnam, the Malay Peninsula and the East Indies to Sulawesi, as well as the Philippines.

Behavior and diet
These snakes are fossorial, spending much of their time hidden. They emerge at dusk to actively forage for frogs, other snakes, and small mammals. They are not venomous, and kill their prey with constriction.

Species

T) Type species.

Captivity
These snakes are not very commonly kept as pets because of their high mortality rate in captivity. Shipping and the first six months in captivity are very stressful and often kill captive snakes. They also have very little tolerance of handling, with the resulting stress leading to premature death. Captive specimens should be provided with a temperature gradient and an easy to burrow substrate. The cage should be kept warm, but not hot, and they should be left alone.

References

 
Reptiles of Southeast Asia
Taxa named by Charles Lucien Bonaparte
Snake genera
Reptiles of China